The men's horizontal bar competition at the 1948 Summer Olympics was held at Earls Court Exhibition Centre on 12 and 13 August. It was the seventh appearance of the event. There were 121 competitors from 16 nations, with each nation sending a team of up to 8 gymnasts. The event was won by Josef Stalder of Switzerland, with his countryman Walter Lehmann taking silver. It was the nation's second victory in the event (after 1928), tying the United States for most all-time. Veikko Huhtanen of Finland earned bronze, giving Finland a three-Games podium streak in the event.

Background

This was the seventh appearance of the event, which is one of the five apparatus events held every time there were apparatus events at the Summer Olympics (no apparatus events were held in 1900, 1908, 1912, or 1920). Two of the top 10 gymnasts from 1936 returned: gold medalist Aleksanteri Saarvala and fifth-place finisher Heikki Savolainen of Finland. Savolainen was competing in his fourth Olympics; he had placed 13th in 1928 and won the silver medal in 1932. The reigning world champion, Michael Reusch of Switzerland, had won that title in 1938; he was still competing and a serious contender (taking gold in the parallel bars in London).

Argentina, Cuba, Denmark, and Egypt each made their debut in the men's parallel bars. The United States made its sixth appearance, most of any nation, having missed only the inaugural 1896 Games.

Competition format

The gymnastics format continued to use the aggregation format. Each nation entered a team of up to eight gymnasts (Cuba and Argentina had only 7; Mexico only 5). All entrants in the gymnastics competitions performed both a compulsory exercise and a voluntary exercise for each apparatus, with the scores summed to give a final total. The scores in each of the six apparatus competitions were added together to give individual all-around scores; the top six individual scores on each team were summed to give a team all-around score. No separate finals were contested.

For each exercise, four judges gave scores from 0 to 10 in one-tenth point increments. The top and bottom scores were discarded and the remaining two scores summed to give the exercise total. If the two scores were sufficiently far apart, the judges would "confer" and decide on a score. Thus, exercise scores ranged from 0 to 20, apparatus scores from 0 to 40, individual totals from 0 to 240, and team scores from 0 to 1,440.

Schedule

All times are British Summer Time (UTC+1)

Results

References

Men's horizontal bar
1948
Men's 1948
Men's events at the 1948 Summer Olympics